The Minister of Education is one of the 19 ministerial portfolios which comprise the Finnish Government. The Minister of Education leads Finland's Ministry of Education and Culture.

Finland's incumbent Minister of Education is Li Andersson of the Left Alliance.

See also 
 Education in Finland

References 

Lists of government ministers of Finland